The Mersing River is a river in the state of  Johor,  Malaysia. It flows from south to north with a catchment of 270 km². The River mouth is in Mersing and goes to the South China Sea.

References

Mersing District
Rivers of Johor